The Victim is a 2012 Konkani theatrical film directed by Milroy Goes, It was the first Konkani Digital Theatrical film in Konkani Cinema with Bollywood actors that was shot entirely on Canon EOS 7D. Starring Kunal Malarkar, Prajkta Biliye and Deepraj Rana. Razak Khan plays the role of a bus conductor. Assistant Director Rohan Austin Goes. The supporting cast includes Deepraj Rana, Ragesh Asthana, Princy Gupta, Prajkta Biliye and Kunal Malarkar. Produced by Jerryton Dias under the banner of Diasons Ventures, the film is set and shot completely in Goa. It premiered at Inox, Goa on 3 August 2012. the film was screened in Karwar Karnataka on 14 September 2012 after the successful premiere and 2 weeks screening in Goa.

Plot
The film tells the life story of Ashley, a character portrayed by Kunal Malarkar. How he is bound to look after two families and fall a victim.

It is said that marriages are made in Heaven; but the saddest thing that nobody discussed was, that the doubt created in mind can ruin a happy married life. It has been happening in most recent marriages, many a time they fail. This is a story of doubt, trust, responsibilities of a family man. How a doubt can victimize a family and how children suffer. The story revolves around two good friends 'King Deepraj Rana and Ashley (Kunal Malarkar)' where one dies in an accident while accomplishing a task given by his friend Ashley. Even though Ashley is married, he is obliged to give homely support to his friend's wife Veronica (Jitu Jadhav) and her daughter.

This leads to a situation beyond repairs with Ashley (Kunal Malarkar) and his wife Sonia (Princy Gupta).
Ashley ends up being Partially paralyzed and Deaf as Sonia decides to take the kids and walk away and when Sonia realizes Ashley is innocent, it's a little too late.

The inevitable phase in his life takes a drastic turn where fate leads his personal life beyond repairs.

Cast
 Kunal Malarkar as Ashley
 Prajkta Biliye as Sis Melissa
 Deepraj Rana as King
 Razak Khan
 Ragesh B Asthanaa as Lawyer
 Keshav Nadkarni as Lawyer
 Princy Gupta as Sonia
 Apoorva Sharma
 Kevin Demello
 Jitu Jadhav
 Jerryton Dias in a guest appearance

Production and release
The film has been scripted by Jerryton A. Dias. The film was entirely shot in Goa where the film is set. The editing and post-production was entirely done in Goa at D&A Productions.

Soundtrack
Composed by Anna Rebelo e Gomes, the music album comprises six tracks penned and tuned by Jerryton A. Dias with the background music of D&A Productions, Vasco. The music has been released online on CD Baby. The tracklist includes Peppy Love Song "Kallzam Amchim" by Elston Pereira feat. Hema Sardesai, "Mog" by Natania Baptista, "Visvas" by Veeam Braganza, "Jivit Mojem" by Nephie Rod, "Noxib" and "Sonvsar" by Anthony Fernandes.

References

External links
 
 

2012 drama films
2012 films
Indian nonlinear narrative films
Indian drama films
2010s Konkani-language films